Chapmanite is a rare silicate mineral belonging to the nesosilicate group, discovered in 1924, and named in honour of the late Edward John Chapman (1821–1904), a geology professor at the University of Toronto. Chemically, it is an iron antimony silicate, closely related to bismutoferrite, and may contain aluminium impurities. It is closely associated with silver mines, most notably the Keeley mine in Ontario, Canada, found in quartz veinlets containing graphite in gneiss. It takes the form of a powdery, yellow-green, semitransparent solid, and leaves a streak of the same color. Early German texts have referred to the mineral as antimon-hypochlorite.

It was recently rediscovered in the southern hemisphere at the abandoned Argent lead mine in Bushveld series rocks of South Africa.

References

Mineralienatlas
Mindat with location data
Webmineral data
Handbook of Mineralogy (PDF)
 South African discovery Neues Jahrbuch fur Mineralogie-Monatshefte 2000 #2 pages: 85 - 90

Antimony minerals
Iron minerals
Phyllosilicates
Monoclinic minerals
Minerals in space group 8
Minerals described in 1924